Victor Majérus (26 March 1913 – 10 June 1978) was a Luxembourgian footballer. He competed in the men's tournament at the 1936 Summer Olympics.

References

External links
 

1913 births
1978 deaths
Luxembourgian footballers
Luxembourg international footballers
Olympic footballers of Luxembourg
Footballers at the 1936 Summer Olympics
Sportspeople from Esch-sur-Alzette
Association football defenders